Amadaguntla is a village in Kodumur mandal in Kurnool District in Andhra Pradesh.

References

Villages in Kurnool district